Donacoscaptes interlineatus is a moth in the family Crambidae. It was described by Zeller in 1881. It is found in Colombia.

References

Haimbachiini
Moths described in 1881